Giallo Queens is an English rock band primarily from the 1970s who went through several genres, ranging from pop ballads to experimental music, often incorporating theatrical shock rock. The individual members operate under anonymity, wearing masks during public performances, with the exception of the singer. After a break up in 1982, the band reformed in 2007 and began a series of tours in Europe.

Career

The Giallos
In 1971, drummer Paul Statham, pianist Ambrose Crow and guitarist Chas Powell joined with singer Candid Lee to form a pop group called The Giallos.

Their first success came with the single "I Like Birds" in mid-1972 which secured them a contract with Tragedy Records. The second single, "Girl From Mars", in April 1973, was well received within the avant-garde milieu. The Giallos built their reputation playing clubs in London over the three-year period that followed, synthesizing their works in the album Obscure Destiny (1976), which sold poorly.

Upon the death of their lead singer Candid Lee in a plane crash in March 1976, The Giallos decided a change of tone and name.

Giallo Queens 
The 1976 April concert at Liverpool was operated under the name Giallo Queens. As a tribute to Lee, the musicians wore sad masks. Only their new singer, Clara Wisp, showed her face. The public reaction was immediate and sent the Giallo Queens into the attention of the media. Under the management of Tragedy Records the band developed a dark, mysterious aspect and released an album at the end of the year called Beyond A Laudanum Rainbow (1976). Several songs referred directly to Lee's disappearance, such as "Crashin' Planes".

Scenography 
Giallo Queens mixed planned, complex scenes involving strong emotions, esoteric lyrics and esthetic choreographies with moments of improvisation.

Masks 
Previously to Candid's accident, the musicians of the Giallos were sometimes wearing outrageous make up, but since the 1976 April concert of Giallo Queens they have been wearing masks concealing their identity. Some of their songs actually play with this. The 1982 album Behind Their Human Masks is full of such references. Their actual identities are unknown. This unusual situation is similar to the Residents, a band from the same era.

Executions 
With a dramatization inspired by the German Expressionism of the 30', the Giallo Queens scenified obviously fake executions. Alice Cooper acknowledged their existence in a rare interview, though the degree of their mutual influence is unknown. During this period two albums were released: Guillotine Carnival (1979) and Cabaret Apocalypse (1981)

Final years
Giallo Queens disbanded by the end of 1982.

References

External links
  Giallo Queens official site
  Giallo Queens Myspace

American experimental rock groups
Dark rock groups
Death rock groups
English pop rock music groups
Musical groups established in 1971
English psychedelic rock music groups